Amédée is a given name of French origin.

Amédée or Amedee or variation, may also refer to:

Places
 Amedee Army Airfield, a military use airport in Herlong, California, United States
 Amédée Island, New Caledonia; an island with the Amédée Lighthouse
 Amédée Lake (Baie-Comeau), in Baie-Comeau, Quebec, Canada
 Amédée Lighthouse, an iron lighthouse located on Amédée Island, New Caledonia
 Amédée River, a tributary of the Saint Lawrence River in Baie-Comeau, Quebec, Canada
 14012 Amedee, a minor planet

People with the surname
 Beryl Amedee, American politician in the Louisiana House of Representatives
 Lynn Amedee (born 1941), American football player and coach

Other uses
 Amédée, or How to Get Rid of It, a 1954 play by Eugène Ionesco

See also

 
 
 
 Amade (name)
 Amadea (disambiguation)
 Amadee (disambiguation)
 Amedeo (disambiguation)
 Amadeus (disambiguation)